Verkhounzha is a rural locality (a village) in Butylitskoye Rural Settlement, Melenkovsky District, Vladimir Oblast, Russia. The population was 187 as of 2010. There are 4 streets.

Geography 
Verkhounzha is located on the Unzha River, 17 km northwest of Melenki (the district's administrative centre) by road. Kopnino is the nearest rural locality.

References 

Rural localities in Melenkovsky District
Melenkovsky Uyezd